Savignya is a monotypic genus of flowering plants belonging to the family Brassicaceae. It only contains one known species, Savignya parviflora (Delile) Webb 

It has 2 Accepted subspecies;
 Savignya parviflora subsp. globosa  -  Libya
 Savignya parviflora subsp. parviflora - (range is same as species)

Its native range is Northern Africa (within Algeria, Egypt, Libya, Morocco and Tunisia) to Pakistan and the Arabian Peninsula (Afghanistan, the Gulf States, Iran, Iraq, Kuwait, Oman, Palestine, Saudi Arabia and the Sinai desert).

The genus name of Savignya is in honour of Marie Jules César Savigny (1777–1851), a French zoologist. The Latin specific epithet of parviflora means "with small flowers".
The genus was first described and published in Mém. Mus. Hist. Nat. Vol.7 on page 231 in 1821. The species was first published in Fragm. Fl. Aethiop.-Aegypt. on page 14 in 1854.

References

Brassicaceae
Brassicaceae genera
Plants described in 1821
Flora of North Africa
Flora of Western Asia